Ny-London is an abandoned mining settlement on Blomstrandøya, Svalbard, established by the prospector Ernest Mansfield on behalf of the Northern Exploration Company (NEC) in 1911. Mansfield discovered marble on the island in 1906, after which he described the deposits as being "no less than an island of pure marble."

Around 1912, a sizeable amount of the mined marble was shipped to England in order to convince investors. However, the marble turned out to be useless due to the effects of frost weathering, causing it to disintegrate as it reached warmer climates.

All mining operations in the settlement ceased in 1920, after years of little to no activity.

References

1911 establishments in Norway
Company towns in Norway
Former populated places in Svalbard
Mining communities in Norway
Tourist attractions in Svalbard